Gennady Golovkin vs. Daniel Jacobs, billed as Middleweight Madness, was a professional boxing fight contested for the unified WBA (Super), WBC, IBF, IBO championship. The bout was on March 18, 2017 at Madison Square Garden in New York City, New York. It was televised on HBO pay-per-view in the United States, and on BoxNation in the United Kingdom.

Background 
Following Gennady Golovkin's win over Kell Brook, there were immediate talks of a WBA unification fight against 'Regular' champion Daniel Jacobs, as part of WBA's plan to reduce the amount of world titles in each division from three to one. Team Golovkin spoke of fighting Billy Joe Saunders after the Jacobs fight which would be a middleweight unification fight for all the belts.

The date discussed initially was 10 December, which Golovkin's team had on hold for Madison Square Garden. The date was originally set by HBO for Álvarez after he defeated Liam Smith, but Canelo confirmed he would not be fighting again until 2017 after fracturing his right thumb. There was ongoing negotiations between Tom Loeffler and Al Haymon about the split in purses, if the fight goes to purse bids, it would be a 75–25 split with Golovkin taking the majority due to him being the 'Super' champion. As the negotiations continued, Jacobs wanted a better split, around 60–40. The WBA granted an extension for the negotiation period on 7 October, as the two sides originally had until October 10 to come to an arrangement or else a purse bid would be due. There was also a request to change the purse bid split to 60–40, which the WBA declined. Golovkin started his training camp for the fight on 17 October.

Loeffler told the LA Times on 18 October that although the negotiations were still active, the fight would not take place on December 10. A new date for early 2017 would need to be set, still looking at Madison Square Garden to host the fight. Golovkin prides himself on being an extremely active fighter, and this is the first year since 2012 that he has been in fewer than three fights. WBA president Gilberto Mendoza confirmed in an email to RingTV that a deal had to be made by 5pm on December 7 or a purse bid would be held on December 19 in Panama. Later that day, the WBA announced a purse bid would be scheduled with a minimum bid of $400,000, with Golovkin receiving 75% and Jacobs 25%. Although purse bids were announced, Loeffler stated he would carry on negotiations, hopeful that a deal would be reached before the purse bid.

On December 17, terms were finally agreed, and it was announced that the fight would take place at Madison Square Garden in New York City on March 18, 2017, broadcast exclusively on HBO PPV. Golovkin tweeted the announcement whilst Jacobs uploaded a short video on social media. At the time of the fight, the fighters had a combined 35 consecutive knockouts. It was reported that Golovkin's IBO world title would not be at stake, but the IBO website later confirmed the belt would be at stake. HBO officially announced the fight on December 22, billed as "Middleweight Madness". Loeffler confirmed there was no rematch clause in place.

Weigh in 
At the official weigh-in, a day before the fight, Golovkin tipped the scales at 159.6 lb, while Jacobs weighed 159.8 lb. Jacobs declined to compete for the IBF title by skipping a fight-day weight check.

Thus far, the IBF title was not on the line for Jacobs, as he skipped the procedure. HBO's Max Kellerman assumed that this was a part of the Team Jacobs' strategic plan, "because no one, in the end, is gonna remember who won the belt, they're gonna remember who won the fight." Kellerman, Jim Lampley and Roy Jones Jr. estimated that Jacobs came to fight Golovkin weighing around 180 pounds, therefore being a legitimate light heavyweight that night with a considerably increased punching power.

Fight details 
In front of a sell out crowd of 19,939, the fight went the full 12 rounds. This was the first time that Golovkin fought 12 rounds in his professional career. Golovkin's ring control, constant forward pressure and effective jab lead to a 115-112, 115-112, 114-113 unanimous decision victory, ending his 23 fight knockout streak which dated back to November 2008. ESPN had Golovkin winning 115-112. The opening three rounds were quiet with very little action. In the fourth round, Golovkin dropped Jacobs with a short right hand along the ropes for a flash knockdown. Jacobs recovered, but Golovkin controlled most of the middle rounds. Jacobs was effective in switching between orthodox and southpaw stance, but remained on the back foot. Both boxers were warned once in the fight by referee Charlie Fitch for rabbit punching.

Following the fight, some doubted Golovkin did enough to win. Jacobs thought he had won the fight by two rounds and attributed the loss to the potential big money fight that is Golovkin vs. Canelo. Jacobs also stated after being knocked down, he told Golovkin, "he'd have to kill me." In the post-fight interview, Golovkin said, “I’m a boxer, not a killer. I respect the game.” Before revenue shares, it was reported that Golovkin would earn at least $2.5 million compared to Jacobs' $1.75 million.

CompuBox stats 
According to CompuBox punch stats, Golovkin landed 231 of 615 punches (38%) which was more than Jacobs who landed 175 of 541 (32%).

Reception 
On March 24, Tom Loeffler revealed the fight generated 170,000 pay-per-view buys. A replay was shown on HBO later in the week and averaged 709,000 viewers. Lance Pugmire from LA Times reported the live gate was $3.7 million, a big increase from the Golovkin vs. Lemieux PPV which achieved $2 million. He also said that merchandise and sponsors were higher.

Official scorecards

Fight card

Fight purses 
Guaranteed base purses
 Gennady Golovkin ($2.5 million) vs. Daniel Jacobs ($1.75 million)
 Román González ($550,000) vs. Srisaket Sor Rungvisai. ($75,000)

Notes

References

External links
 Gennady Golovkin's career boxing record
 Daniel Jacobs's career boxing record
 Event details

2017 in boxing
Boxing matches at Madison Square Garden
Boxing on HBO
September 2017 sports events in the United States
Boxing matches
2017 in sports in New York City